Jennifer Lynn Knapp (born April 12, 1974) is an American-Australian folk rock, and contemporary Christian musician. She is best known for her first single "Undo Me" from her debut album, Kansas (1998), and the song "A Little More" from her Grammy Award-nominated album, Lay It Down (2000). The Way I Am (2001), was also nominated for a Grammy. In total, the three albums have sold approximately 1 million copies. After taking a seven-year hiatus, Knapp announced in September 2009 that she was returning to music. On May 11, 2010, she released Letting Go with the single "Dive In". The album debuted at No. 73 on the Billboard 200 chart. Knapp's memoir Facing the Music (Howard Books / Simon & Schuster) and new album Set Me Free (Righteous Babe Records) came out in October 2014. Her 2017 album release, Love Comes Back Around produced by Viktor Krauss, pairs her fearless songwriting and strong, expressive voice with rootsy arrangements.

Early life
Knapp was born in Chanute, Kansas on April 12, 1974, and was brought up irreligiously along with her twin sister Lori. Knapp's parents divorced when she was three and she spent an unhappy childhood with her remarried father until leaving home at 18.

As a classically trained musician Knapp played trumpet in high school, and attended Pittsburg State University on a music scholarship. It was there that she converted to Christianity and eventually incorporated spiritual themes into her music.

From there, Knapp began performing throughout the Midwest selling her two custom recordings at shows. Her second indie album, Wishing Well, attracted the attention of Nashville label Gotee Records, who signed her the following year.

Musical career
Kansas, her critically acclaimed debut release, was received widely and eventually sold over 500,000 copies, becoming Gold-certified by the RIAA. She began touring America, singing primarily in churches, but also appeared at festivals such as the 1999 Lilith Fair, and at large venues including during her 2000 tour in which she opened for Christian music headliner Third Day. She won Dove Awards in 1999 for New Artist of the Year and Rock Song of the Year for her song Undo Me. Lay It Down, her 2000 release, garnered a Grammy Award nomination in 2001.

In addition to her own releases, she has collaborated with a number of artists on various studio projects and releases including lending an early studio version of the song A Little More from Lay It Down on Sparrow Records' 1999 compilation album Listen Louder.

Hiatus
In an interview from the January/February 2004 issue of Relevant Magazine, Knapp stated that she was taking a break from music for a while, leaving the future of her career in God's hands. She had released two albums, Lay It Down and The Way I Am, in 2000 and 2001 respectively, which Knapp said caused a stressful touring schedule. She said she'd already made the decision to take a break in mid-2001, but her schedule did not allow her to stop performing until September 2002, when she played the last concert of her tour.  "It was definitely time for a break," she said. "I was touring Lay It Down while recording The Way I Am, then went directly into touring that record. It got to where I was just doing shows to support the record, rather than having a record support the heart of the people I was supposed to be serving." Knapp gave no indication of when new material would surface. "Truly, no plans and no promises of when," she said. "At this time, there's really not enough material and I don't want to force anything just for the sake of getting a record finished."

On January 24, 2006, Gotee Records issued the album Jennifer Knapp Live with tracks from her three studio albums recorded live in concert. On February 26, 2008, Gotee Records re-issued a 10th anniversary edition of Kansas with re-mastered and additional tracks, including "Jesus Loves Me (Wishing Well version)" and other tracks from her 2006 live album.

Return to music
On August 28, 2009, Patrol Magazine reported that Knapp's management confirmed she is "starting to write and record again."  On September 18, Knapp issued a personal letter to fans on her website in which she discussed her hiatus and her plans to return to music.  Knapp returned from her hiatus on September 24 with a concert at the Hotel Cafe in Los Angeles, California.

On February 4, 2010, Knapp announced that her new album Letting Go would be released on May 11. She also announced spring 2010 tour dates with Derek Webb and summer appearances on the revived Lilith Fair tour.

Knapp began recording a new album in Nashville with producer Jacob Lawson in early 2014. The album Set Me Free was released on October 14, 2014, on Righteous Babe Records. In 2019, she announced she wanted to advocate for LGBT people of faith, and would begin performing Christian music again.

Personal life
Following the end of her 2002 tour, Knapp moved to Australia and has since taken up Australian citizenship.

In simultaneous interviews with Christianity Today, Reuters, and The Advocate published on April 13, 2010, Knapp announced that she is a lesbian, and has been in a same-sex relationship since 2002. She has said that her decision to leave the Christian music industry was not due solely to her coming out but to a number of factors including stress and burnout. Despite criticisms based on her sexual orientation, Knapp says that she not only still holds to her Christian faith, but feels that by being honest about her sexuality that her faith is actually enhanced. However, she stated that Letting Go would not be marketed towards Christian radio. The controversy surrounding her coming out made her the featured subject of an episode of Larry King Live, where she discussed her orientation and faith with Larry King, Bob Botsford, and Ted Haggard.

Advocacy
In 2011, Jennifer launched Inside Out Faith, an advocacy organization for LGBT people of faith. Through Inside Out Faith, Knapp speaks at churches and universities about her journey coming out to her faith community.

Facing the Music
Jennifer's memoir, Facing the Music: My Story, was released on Howard Books / Simon & Schuster on October 7, 2014. Howard Books, an evangelical publisher, received some pushback for publishing Knapp's memoir; however, Howard's VP and Publisher, Jonathan Merkh, stated that the company was not trying to take sides but simply "help [people] understand where someone may be coming from as they open up about their sexuality and their faith."

Discography

Albums
1994: Circle Back
1996: Wishing Well
1998: Kansas
2000: Lay It Down
2001: The Way I Am
2010: Letting Go
2012: The Hymns of Christmas (with Margaret Becker)
2014: Set Me Free
2017: Love Comes Back Around

EPs
2010: Evolving EP - Six tracks, five of which were later released on Letting Go

Live albums
2006: Jennifer Knapp Live

Compilations
2003: The Collection
2004: 8 Great Hits
1999: ''Heaven & Earth: A Tapestry of Worship

Singles
 1997: "Undo Me" – No. 1 CHR, No. 4 Rock
 1998: "Romans" – No. 1 CHR
 1999: "A Little More"
 2001: "Breathe on Me"

Charts

Certification for Kansas

References

External links
 
 

1974 births
Living people
20th-century American singers
20th-century Protestants
20th-century American women singers
21st-century American singers
21st-century Protestants
American emigrants to Australia
American expatriates in Australia
American folk rock musicians
American performers of Christian music
Australian Protestants
Converts to Protestantism from atheism or agnosticism
EMI Records artists
Gotee Records artists
American lesbian musicians
American LGBT singers
American LGBT songwriters
LGBT people from Kansas
LGBT Protestants
Lesbian songwriters
Lesbian singers
People from Chanute, Kansas
Pittsburg State University alumni
Righteous Babe Records artists
Singers from Kansas
21st-century American women singers